The yellow-bellied tit (Pardaliparus venustulus) is a bird in the family Paridae. The species was first described by Robert Swinhoe in 1870.

It is endemic to China. Its natural habitats are temperate forest and subtropical or tropical moist lowland forest.

 Male yellow- bellied tits are very territorial, but  they have a mutual respect for their neighbors. This is called the “dear- enemy” effect, since the birds respect each other's territory and want to maintain friendships.

References

External links
Yellow-bellied tit at the Internet Bird Collection

yellow-bellied tit
Endemic birds of China
yellow-bellied tit
Taxonomy articles created by Polbot